Felimare orsinii is a species of colourful sea slug, a dorid nudibranch in the family Chromodorididae.

Distribution
This nudibranch is found in the Western Mediterranean Sea. Animals from the Eastern Mediterranean apparently lack the yellow colour in the submarginal line, but are considered to be the same species.

Description
Felimare orsinii is one of a group of Felimare species from the Mediterranean Sea which are all quite similar. This species can be distinguished from the others by the entirely blue gills and rhinophores and the small raised tubercles on the back. There is a single median white line which is slightly edged with blue and a line at the edge of the mantle which is white except at the sides where it grades into yellow. The body reaches a length of 20 mm. This species eats the sponge Scalarispongia scalaris. Previously known as Hypselodoris orsinii all Atlantic species of Hypselodoris were shown to belong to a separate clade and were transferred to the genus Felimare in 2012.

Gallery

References

External links
 

Chromodorididae
Gastropods described in 1846